Live in Paris, Tom Rhodes' second live album, was recorded at the historic Hotel du Nord in Paris, France, during its last night as an operating live venue. The 2006 release featured material about Tom’s extensive world travels, some of which happened during his tenure as a host on Dutch television.

Track listing 
 "Karel Beer Intro"
 "Living in Amsterdam / Moving Back to America"
 "Muslim Girlfriend"
 "The World Today"
 "Why I Love Black People / Smoking and Drinking"
 "Why I Love Canada / Why I Love Peru"
 "My History with Paris"
 "Why I Love China / Why I Love Australia"
 "Why I Love Florida"
 "Lightnin’ Rhodes"
 "Hooray for Love!"
 "Passport to Freakyland"
 "Why I Love England"
 "Why Dutch People are My Favorite"
 "Why I Love Ireland"
 "Taxi Driver Genius"
 "Music Sweet Music"

Tom Rhodes albums
2006 live albums
Live comedy albums
Stand Up! Records live albums
2000s comedy albums
Stand-up comedy albums